The Gustav Mahler Conducting Competition is one of the most important music competitions of its kind worldwide and is held in Bamberg, Germany.  Conductors no older than 35 years may enter.

History 
The competition was founded by the Bamberg Symphony Orchestra, with the idea of helping young conductors at the start of their conducting careers. The first prize includes a cash prize and engagements with several orchestras.

It started in 2004 with Gustavo Dudamel’s decisive win and since then has taken place every three years.

Winners

2004

Jury 
 Marina Mahler (Patronesse of the Competition and Honorary Member of the Jury)
 Jonathan Nott (Principal Conductor of the Bamberg Symphony and President of the Jury)
 Leon Botstein (Principal Conductor and Artistic Director of the American Symphony Orchestra)
 Lawrence Foster (Artistic Director of Orchestra of the Gulbenkian Foundation Lisbon)
 Esa-Pekka Salonen (Chief Conductor and Artistic Director of Los Angeles Philharmonic and Composer)
 Magnus Lindberg (Composer)
 Paul Müller (Managing Director and CEO of the Bamberg Symphony)
 Ernest Fleischmann (Consultant and former Managing Director of the San Francisco Symphony)
 Rolf Beck (Head of NDR Orchestras and Choir Hamburg and Director of the Schleswig-Holstein Music Festival)
 Serge Dorny (General Director of L’Opéra National de Lyon)
 Peter Pastreich (Consultant)
 Markus Mayers (Member of the Board of the Bamberg Symphony)

2007 
The Second Bamberg Symphony Orchestra Gustav Mahler Conducting Competition took place on 23-28 April 2007 at Sinfonie an der Regnitz, Joseph-Keilberth-Saal, Bamberg.

Jury 
 Marina Mahler (Honorary member)
 Jonathan Nott (Jury President; Principal Conductor, Bamberg Symphony Orchestra)
 Herbert Blomstedt (Honorary Conductor for Life, Bamberg Symphony Orchestra)
 Hans Graf (Music Director, Houston Symphony Orchestra)
 Mark-Anthony Turnage (Composer)
 Paul Müller (Intendant, Bamberg Symphony Orchestra)
 Rolf Beck (Intendant, Schleswig-Holstein Music Festival)
 Serge Dorny (Director-General, L'Opéra National de Lyon)
 Ernest Fleischmann (Consultant)
 Peter Pastreich (Consultant)
 Christian Dibbern (Member of the Orchestra Board of the Bamberg Symphony)

2010 
The 3rd competition took place in Bamberg, Germany, from February 26 to March 7, 2010.

Competitors 
  Elizabeth Askren
  Cornelius Heine
  Seokwon Hong
  Yordan Kamdzhalov
  Francesco Lanzillotta
   Alexander Prior
  Ainars Rubikis
  Scott Seaton
  Aziz Shokakimov
  Lam Tran
  Kosuke Tsunoda
  Xenia Zharko

Jury 
  Marina Fistoulari-Mahler (honorary juror)
  Jonathan Nott (president)
  Herbert Blomstedt
  John Carewe
  Wolfgang Fink
  Jonathan Mills
  Jan Nast
  Matthias Pintscher
  A member of the Bamberg Symphony Orchestra

Repertoire 
 Joseph Haydn - Symphony No. 104
 Gustav Mahler - Symphony No. 4
 Gustav Mahler - A selection from his lieder cycles
 Matthias Pintscher - Towards Osiris
 Anton Webern - Five pieces for orchestra, op.10
 Jörg Widmann - Con brio

2013 
From 7 to 14 June 2013 the Bamberg Symphony held The Mahler Competition for the fourth time. 407 young conductors applied to compete.

Candidates 
 Tung-Chieh Chuang, Taiwan
 David Danzmayr, Austria
 Botinis Dimitris, Greece / Russia
 Gad Kadosh, Israel / France
 Yoshinao Kihara, Japan
 Manuel López-Gómez, Venezuela
 June-Sung Park, South Korea
 Lahav Shani, Israel
 Dalia Stasevska, Finland
 Yuko Tanaka, Japan
 Zoi Tsokanou, Greece
 Joseph Young, US

Jury 
 Marina Mahler
 Jonathan Nott
 Markus Stenz
 John Carewe
 Rolf Wallin
 Louwrens Langevoort
 Jonathan Mills
 Albert Schmitt
 Wolfgang Fink
 Christian Dibbern

Repertoire 
 Gustav Mahler: Symphony No. 1 D major, 1st movement and Symphony No. 6 A minor, 2nd and 3rd movement; Song of a Wayfarer; "Ich bin der Welt abhanden gekommen" from the Rückert song cycle
 Joseph Haydn: Symphony No. 92 G major Hob. I:92
 Alban Berg: Lyrische Suite. Three Pieces for String Orchestra, 1928
 György Ligeti: Melodies for Orchestra, 1971
 Rolf Wallin: Act for Orchestra, 2003

2016 

From 6 to 13 May 2016 the Bamberg Symphony held The Mahler Competition for the fifth time.

Out of 381 applicants from 64 countries, 14 candidates were invited to Bamberg, 11 male and 3 female.

The members of the Jury were Jonathan Nott, President of the Jury and former Principal Conductor of the Bamberg Symphony, Marina Mahler, the composer’s granddaughter and Honorary Member, Marcus Rudolf Axt, Chief Executive of the Bamberg Symphony, the conductors Jiří Bělohlávek, John Carewe and Sir Neville Marriner, the conductor and singer Barbara Hannigan, the conductor and composer Jörg Widmann, the President and CEO of the Los Angeles Philharmonic Deborah Borda, the artist consultant Martin Campbell-White, the Provost and Dean of The Juilliard School Ara Guzelimian and Boris-Alexander Jusa, a member of the Bamberg Symphony.

The Competition’s repertoire consisted of works by Gustav Mahler, Joseph Haydn, Henri Dutilleux, Anton Webern, Jörg Widmann and Georg Friedrich Haas.

Prizes 
 1st Prize, € 20,000
 2nd Prize, € 10,000
 3rd Prize, € 5,000

2020 
From 29 June to 5 July 2020 the Bamberg Symphony held The Mahler Competition for the sixth time. From 336 applicants 12 candidates where chosen to participate in the competition in Bamberg.

Candidates 
 Yeo Ryeong Ahn
 Finnegan Downie Dear
 Killian Farrell
 Orr Guy
 Andreas Hansson
 Thomas Jung
 Piero Lombardi Iglesias
 Wilson Ng
 Harry Ogg
 Mikhail Shekhtman
 Christian Vasquez
 Katharina Wincor

Jury 
 Marina Mahler (Patronesse of the Competition and Honorary Member of the Jury)
 Jakub Hrůša (Principal Conductor of the Bamberg Symphony and President of the Jury)
 Pamela Rosenberg (former Managing Director and CEO of the Berlin Philharmonic)
 John Carewe (Conductor)
 Martin Campbell-White (Consultant and Founder of Askonas Holt and President of the Mahler Foundation Santa Cruz USA)
 Ara Guzelimian (Provost and Dean, The Juilliard School, and Artistic Director of the Ojai Music Festival)
 Barbara Hannigan (Conductor and Singer)
 Lahav Shani (Chief Conductor of the Rotterdam Philharmonic Orchestra and Music Director Designate of the Israel Philharmonic Orchestra)
 Juanjo Mena (Principal Conductor of the Cincinnati May Festival and Associate Conductor of the Spanish National Orchestra)
 Mark Stringer (Professor for Orchestra Conducting at the University of Music and Performing Arts, Vienna)
 Miroslav Srnka (Composer)
 Marcus Axt (Managing Director and CEO of the Bamberg Symphony)
 Martin Timphus (Member of the Orchestral Board of Bamberg Symphony)

Repertoire 
 Gustav Mahler: Symphony Nr. 4 G Major for Soprano and Orchestra
 Wolfgang Amadeus Mozart: Symphony Nr. 26 E Major KV 184
 Anton Webern: Variations for Orchestra op. 30 
 Helmut Lachenmann: "Tableau" 
 Miroslav Srnka: move 04 "Memory Full" (world premiere)

Prizes 
 1st Prize € 30,000
 2nd Prize € 20,000
 3rd Prize € 10,000

References

External links
 

 
Music competitions in Germany